Statistics of Bahraini Premier League for the 1999–2000 season.

Overview
It was contested by 12 teams, and Bahrain Riffa Club won the championship.

Regular season

Group 1

Group 2

Championship playoff

Group A

Group B

Championship playoff

Semifinals
Muharraq Club 0-3 : 1-0 Bahrain Riffa Club
Al-Ahli 2-3 : 0-1 East Riffa Club

Third-place match
Muharraq Club 2-3 Al-Ahli

Final
Bahrain Riffa Club 4-0 East Riffa Club

Relegation playoff

References
Bahrain - List of final tables (RSSSF)

Bahraini Premier League seasons
Bah
1999–2000 in Bahraini football